Abderrazzak Jadid (born 1 June 1983 in Fkih Ben Saleh) is a Moroccan footballer. He currently plays as midfield for Italian club AC Rezzato.

Career
Jadid started his career on the youth team at Brescia. After playing on loan for Lumezzane of Serie C1, he made his debut on 15 September 2002, against Piacenza. He was loaned out again in January 2005, to Pisa of Serie C1.

In summer 2005, he returned to Brescia, but at Serie B. He just played once before being loaned to league rival Pescara.

Jadid returned to Brescia in the summer of 2006, but after playing just 6 games in the 2007-08 season he was loaned out again in January 2008 to league rival Bari. He returned to Brescia in July 2008, but has played only once in the 2008–09 season so far.

In October 2009, he signed a 2-year contract with Salernitana.

References

External links
Gazzetta.it  

1983 births
Living people
Moroccan footballers
Moroccan expatriate footballers
Brescia Calcio players
Pisa S.C. players
Delfino Pescara 1936 players
S.S.C. Bari players
U.S. Salernitana 1919 players
K.A.S. Eupen players
Parma Calcio 1913 players
F.C. Grosseto S.S.D. players
L.R. Vicenza players
U.S. Cremonese players
Virtus Entella players
Serie A players
Serie B players
Serie C players
Belgian Pro League players
Expatriate footballers in Italy
Expatriate footballers in Belgium
Moroccan expatriate sportspeople in Italy
Association football wingers
People from Fkih Ben Saleh